Form factor is a hardware design aspect that defines and prescribes the size, shape, and other physical specifications of components, particularly in electronics. A form factor may represent a broad class of similarly sized components, or it may prescribe a specific standard. It may also define an entire system, as in a computer form factor.

Evolution and standardization
As electronic hardware has become smaller following Moore's law and related patterns, ever-smaller form factors have become feasible. Specific technological advances, such as PCI Express, have had a significant design impact, though form factors have historically been slower to evolve than individual components. Standardization of form factors is vital for compatibility of hardware from different manufacturers.

Trade-offs
Smaller form factors may offer more efficient use of limited space, greater flexibility in the placement of components within a larger assembly, reduced use of material, and greater ease of transportation and use. However, smaller form factors typically incur greater costs in the design, manufacturing, and maintenance phases of the engineering lifecycle, and do not allow the same expansion options as larger form factors. In particular, the design of smaller form-factor computers and network equipment must entail careful consideration of cooling. End-user maintenance and repair of small form-factor electronic devices such as mobile phones is often not possible, and may be discouraged by warranty voiding clauses; such devices require professional servicing—or simply replacement—when they fail.

Examples

Computer form factors comprise a number of specific industry standards for motherboards, specifying dimensions, power supplies, placement of mounting holes and ports, and other parameters. Other types of form factors for computers include:
 Small form factor (SFF), a more loosely defined set of standards which may refer to both motherboards and computer cases. SFF devices include mini-towers and  home theater PCs.
 Pizza box form factor, a wide, flat case form factor used for computers and network switches; often sized for installation in a 19-inch rack.
 All-in-one PC
 "Lunchbox" portable computer

Components
 Hard disk drive form factors, the physical dimensions of a computer hard drive
 Hard disk enclosure form factor, the physical dimensions of a computer hard drive enclosure
 Motherboard form factor, the  physical dimensions of a computer motherboard

Mobile form factors
Laptop or notebook, a form of portable computer with a "clamshell design" form factor.
Subnotebook, ultra-mobile PC, netbook, and tablet computer, various form factors for devices which are smaller and often cheaper than a typical notebook.
Mobile phone, including a wide range of sizes and layouts. Broad categories of form factors include: bars, flip phones, and sliders, with many subtypes and variations. Also include phablets (small tablets) and industrial handheld devices.
Stick PC, a single-board computer in a small elongated casing resembling a stick

See also
Computer hardware
Electronic packaging
Packaging engineering
List of computer size categories
List of integrated circuit package dimensions

Notes

References

Design
Electronic design
Industrial design
Packaging
Broad-concept articles